Canada has ten provinces and three territories that are sub-national administrative divisions under the jurisdiction of the Canadian Constitution. In the 1867 Canadian Confederation, three provinces of British North America—New Brunswick, Nova Scotia, and the Province of Canada (which upon Confederation was divided into Ontario and Quebec)—united to form a federation, becoming a fully independent country over the next century. Over its history, Canada's international borders have changed several times as it has added territories and provinces, making it the world's second-largest country by area.

The major difference between a Canadian province and a territory is that provinces receive their power and authority from the Constitution Act, 1867 (formerly called the British North America Act, 1867), whereas territorial governments are creatures of statute with powers delegated to them by the Parliament of Canada. The powers flowing from the Constitution Act are divided between the Government of Canada (the federal government) and the provincial governments to exercise exclusively. A change to the division of powers between the federal government and the provinces requires a constitutional amendment, whereas a similar change affecting the territories can be performed unilaterally by the Parliament of Canada or government.

In modern Canadian constitutional theory, the provinces are considered to be co-sovereign within certain areas based on the divisions of responsibility between the provincial and federal government within the Constitution Act, 1867, and each province thus has its own representative of the Canadian Crown, the lieutenant governor. The territories are not sovereign, but instead their authorities and responsibilities are devolved directly from the federal level, and as a result, have a commissioner that represents the federal government.

Provinces

Notes:

Territories
There are three territories in Canada. Unlike the provinces, the territories of Canada have no inherent sovereignty and have only those powers delegated to them by the federal government. They include all of mainland Canada north of latitude 60° north and west of Hudson Bay and all islands north of the Canadian mainland (from those in James Bay to the Queen Elizabeth Islands). The following table lists the territories in order of precedence (each province has precedence over all the territories, regardless of the date each territory was created).

Another territory, the District of Keewatin, existed from October 7, 1876, until September 1, 1905, when it rejoined the Northwest Territories and became the Keewatin Region. It occupied the area that is now the Kenora District of Ontario, northern Manitoba, and mainland Nunavut. The government of Keewatin was based in Winnipeg, Manitoba. The territory did not have any representation in federal parliament.

Population

The vast majority of Canada's population is concentrated in areas close to the Canada–US border. Its four largest provinces by area (Quebec, Ontario, British Columbia and Alberta) are also (with Quebec and Ontario switched in order) its most populous; together they account for 86% of the country's population. The territories (the Northwest Territories, Nunavut and Yukon) account for over a third of Canada's area but are only home to 0.3% of its population, which skews the national population density value.

Canada's population grew by 5.0% between the 2006 and 2011 censuses. Except for New Brunswick, all territories and provinces increased in population during this time. In terms of percent change, the fastest-growing province or territory was Nunavut with an increase of 12.7% between 2011 and 2016, followed by Alberta with 11.6% growth, while New Brunswick's population decreased by 0.5%.

Generally, Canadian provinces have steadily grown in population along with Canada. However, some provinces such as Saskatchewan, Prince Edward Island and Newfoundland and Labrador have experienced long periods of stagnation or population decline. Ontario and Quebec have always been the two biggest provinces in Canada, with together over 60% of the population at any given time. The population of the West relative to Canada as a whole has steadily grown over time, while that of Atlantic Canada has declined.

Territorial evolution

Ontario, Quebec, New Brunswick, and Nova Scotia were the original provinces, formed when several British North American colonies federated on July 1, 1867, into the Dominion of Canada and by stages began accruing the indicia of sovereignty from the United Kingdom. Prior to this, Ontario and Quebec were united as the Province of Canada. Over the following years, Manitoba (1870), British Columbia (1871), and Prince Edward Island (1873) were added as provinces.

The British Crown had claimed two large areas north-west of the Canadian colony, known as Rupert's Land and the North-Western Territory, and assigned them to the Hudson's Bay Company. In 1870, the company relinquished its claims for £300,000 (CND$1.5 million), assigning the vast territory to the government of Canada. Subsequently, the area was re-organized into the province of Manitoba and the North-West Territories. The North-West Territories encompassed all of current northern and western Canada, except for the British holdings in the Arctic islands and the Colony of British Columbia. NWT included the northern two-thirds of Ontario and Quebec. After the province of Manitoba was established in 1870, in a small area in the south of today's province, almost all of present-day Manitoba was still contained in the NWT. (Manitoba expanded to its present size in 1912.) 

The British claims to the Arctic islands were transferred to Canada in 1880, adding to the size of the North-West Territories. In 1898 the Yukon Territory, later renamed "Yukon" in 2003, was carved from the area surrounding the Klondike gold fields. On September 1, 1905, a portion of the North-West Territories south of the 60th parallel north became the provinces of Alberta and Saskatchewan. In 1912, the boundaries of Quebec, Ontario, and Manitoba were expanded northward: Manitoba's to the 60° parallel, Ontario's to Hudson Bay and Quebec's to encompass the District of Ungava.

In 1869, the people of Newfoundland voted to remain a British colony over fears that taxes would increase with Confederation, and that the economic policy of the Canadian government would favour mainland industries. In 1907, Newfoundland acquired dominion status. In the middle of the Great Depression in Canada, Newfoundland underwent a prolonged economic crisis, and the legislature turned over political control to the Newfoundland Commission of Government in 1933. Following Canada's participation in World War II, in a 1948 referendum, a narrow majority of Newfoundland citizens voted to join the Confederation, and on March 31, 1949, Newfoundland became Canada's tenth province. The province was officially renamed Newfoundland and Labrador in 2001.

Bermuda, the last British North American colony, which had been somewhat subordinated to Nova Scotia, was one of two Imperial fortress colonies in British North America - the other being Nova Scotia, and more particularly the city of Halifax. Halifax and Bermuda were the sites of the Royal Navy's North America Station (or, depending on the time period and the extent of the Western Hemisphere it included, the River St. Lawrence and Coast of America and North America and West Indies Station, the North America and Newfoundland Station, the North America and West Indies Station, and finally the America and West Indies Station) main bases, dockyards, and Admiralty Houses, and the squadron of the station was based at Royal Naval Dockyard, Halifax during the summers and Royal Naval Dockyard, Bermuda in the winters until the 1820s, when Bermuda (which was better located to control the Atlantic Seaboard of the United States, impossible to attack over land, and almost impregnable against attack over water) became the main base year round. A large British Army garrison in Bermuda, which fell under the Commander-in-Chief in Nova Scotia, existed to defend the colony as a naval base (and to prevent it becoming as useful a base to the navy of an adversary), as well as to support amphibious operations throughout the region (such as the Chesapeake campaign during the American War of 1812). Bermuda was consequently the most important British naval and military base in the Americas. Canadian confederation resulted in the Canadian Militia becoming responsible for the defence of the Maritimes, the abolishment of the British Army's commander-in-chief there, and the reduction of British military forces in the Maritimes to a small garrison for the protection of the Halifax dockyard, which would be withdrawn when that dockyard was handed over to the Dominion government in 1905 for use by the new Canadian naval service. Britain retained control of Bermuda as an imperial fortress, with the Governor and Commander-in-Chief of Bermuda (a military officer previously ranking between lieutenant-colonel and major-general) becoming a lieutenant-general termed a General Officer Commanding and the Bermuda garrison becoming a command in its own right. Bermuda was consequently left out of the confederation of Canada, though it retained naval links with Halifax and the state church (or established church), the Church of England, continued to place Bermuda under the Bishop of Newfoundland until 1919 (Bermuda also remained linked to the Maritimes under the Methodist and Roman Catholic churches).

In 1903, resolution of the Alaska Panhandle Dispute fixed British Columbia's northwestern boundary. This was one of only two provinces in Canadian history to have its size reduced. The second reduction, in 1927, occurred when a boundary dispute between Canada and the Dominion of Newfoundland saw Labrador enlarged at Quebec's expense; this land returned to Canada, as part of the province of Newfoundland, in 1949. In 1999, Nunavut was created from the eastern portion of the Northwest Territories. Yukon lies in the western portion of Northern Canada, while Nunavut is in the east.

All three territories combined are the most sparsely populated region in Canada, covering  in land area. They are often referred to as a single region, the North, for organisational and economic purposes. For much of the Northwest Territories' early history it was divided into several districts for ease of administration. The District of Keewatin was created as a separate territory from 1876 to 1905, after which, as the Keewatin Region, it became an administrative district of the Northwest Territories. In 1999, it was dissolved when it became part of Nunavut.

Government

Theoretically, provinces have a great deal of power relative to the federal government, with jurisdiction over many public goods such as health care, education, welfare, and intra-provincial transportation. They receive "transfer payments" from the federal government to pay for these, as well as exacting their own taxes. In practice, however, the federal government can use these transfer payments to influence these provincial areas. For instance, in order to receive healthcare funding under Medicare, provinces must agree to meet certain federal mandates, such as universal access to required medical treatment.

Provincial and territorial legislatures have no second chamber like the Canadian Senate. Originally, most provinces had such bodies, known as legislative councils, with members titled councillors. These upper houses were abolished one by one, Quebec's being the last in 1968. In most provinces, the single house of the legislature is known as the Legislative Assembly; the exceptions are Nova Scotia and Newfoundland and Labrador, where the chamber is called the House of Assembly, and Quebec where it is called the National Assembly. Ontario has a Legislative Assembly but its members are called Members of the Provincial Parliament or MPPs. The legislative assemblies use a procedure similar to that of the House of Commons of Canada. The head of government of each province, called the premier, is generally the head of the party with the most seats. This is also the case in Yukon, but the Northwest Territories and Nunavut have no political parties at the territorial level. The King's representative in each province is the Lieutenant Governor. In each of the territories there is an analogous Commissioner, but they represent the federal government rather than the monarch.

Provincial legislature buildings

Territorial legislature buildings

Map

Provincial political parties
Most provinces have rough provincial counterparts to major federal parties. However, these provincial parties are not usually formally linked to the federal parties that share the same name. For example, no provincial Conservative or Progressive Conservative Party shares an organizational link to the federal Conservative Party of Canada, and neither do provincial Green Parties to the Green Party of Canada.

Provincial New Democratic Parties, on the other hand, are fully integrated with the federal New Democratic Party—meaning that provincial parties effectively operate as sections, with common membership, of the federal party.

The Liberal Party of Canada shares such an organizational integration with Atlantic Canada provincial Liberals in New Brunswick, Newfoundland and Labrador, Nova Scotia, and Prince Edward Island. Other provincial Liberal Parties are unaffiliated with their federal counterpart.

Some provinces have provincial political parties with no clear federal equivalent, such as the Alberta Party and Saskatchewan Party.

The provincial political climate of Quebec is different: the main split is between sovereignty, represented by the Parti Québécois and Québec solidaire, and federalism, represented primarily by the Quebec Liberal Party. The Coalition Avenir Québec, meanwhile, takes an abstentionist position on the question and does not support or oppose sovereignty.

Currently, the one minority provincial/territorial government is held by the Liberals in Yukon.

Ceremonial territory

The Canadian National Vimy Memorial, near Vimy, Pas-de-Calais, and the Beaumont-Hamel Newfoundland Memorial, near Beaumont-Hamel, both in France, are ceremonially considered Canadian territory. In 1922, the French government donated the land used for the Vimy Memorial "freely, and for all time, to the Government of Canada the free use of the land exempt from all taxes". The site of the Somme battlefield near Beaumont-Hamel site was purchased in 1921 by the people of the Dominion of Newfoundland. These sites do not, however, enjoy extraterritorial status and are thus subject to French law.

Proposed provinces and territories

Since Confederation in 1867, there have been several proposals for new Canadian provinces and territories. The Constitution of Canada requires an amendment for the creation of a new province but the creation of a new territory requires only an act of Parliament, a legislatively simpler process.

In late 2004, Prime Minister Paul Martin surprised some observers by expressing his personal support for all three territories gaining provincial status "eventually". He cited their importance to the country as a whole and the ongoing need to assert sovereignty in the Arctic, particularly as global warming could make that region more open to exploitation leading to more complex international waters disputes.

See also

 Canadian provincial and territorial name etymologies
Canadian adjectival and demonymic forms of place names
 Language policies of Canada's provinces and territories
 List of areas disputed by Canada and the United States
 List of regions of Canada
List of governments in Canada by annual expenditures
 Commonwealth Local Government Forum-Americas
 Provincial museums of Canada
 List of Canada-related topics by provinces and territories
List of Canadian provinces and territories by gross domestic product
List of Canadian provincial and territorial symbols
List of Canadian provinces by unemployment rate
List of Canadian provinces and territories by Human Development Index
Population of Canada by province and territory
Flags of provinces and territories of Canada

References

Further reading

External links

Provincial and territorial government web sites – Service Canada
Provincial and territorial legislature web sites – Parliament of Canada
Difference between provinces and territories – Intergovernmental Affairs
 Provincial and territorial statistics – Statistics Canada
Provincial and territorial immigration information  – Citizenship and Immigration Canada
 Canadian governments compared – University of Public Administration

 
 
 
Canada 1
Provinces, Canada